Davidson Building was a historic commercial building located at Hannibal, Marion County, Missouri.  It was built between 1903 and 1905, and was a two-story Romanesque Revival style building. It had a three-bay rock-faced ashlar facade and party walls.  It featured arched windows with radiating voussoirs. It has been demolished.

It was added to the National Register of Historic Places in 1986.

References

Commercial buildings on the National Register of Historic Places in Missouri
Romanesque Revival architecture in Missouri
Commercial buildings completed in 1905
Buildings and structures in Hannibal, Missouri
National Register of Historic Places in Marion County, Missouri
1905 establishments in Missouri
Demolished buildings and structures in Missouri